Eppie is a nickname or given name which can refer to:

People
Eppie Archuleta (1922–2014), American master weaver and textile artisan 
Eppie Barnes (1900–1980), American Major League Baseball and professional basketball player
Eppie Barney (born 1944), American National Football League player in 1967-1968
Eppie Bleeker (born 1949), Dutch retired speedskater
Charlotte Epstein (1884–1938), American swimming coach and feminist
Eppie Gibson, English rugby league footballer who played in the 1940s, 1950s and 1960s
Eppie Lederer (1918–2002), American advice columnist Ann Landers
Eppie Wietzes (born 1938), Canadian Formula One racing driver

Fictional characters
Eppie, a major character in the novel Silas Marner
the title heroine of "Eppie Morrie", one of the Scottish Child Ballads

Products
Eppendorf tube, a plastic microcentrifuge tube named after the first manufacturer of its kind

See also
Eppy (disambiguation)
Epie (disambiguation)

Lists of people by nickname